The 1986 Invercargill mayoral election was held on 11 October 1986 as part of the 1986 New Zealand local elections, and was conducted under the First Past the Post system.

Incumbent mayor Eve Poole was re-elected with an increased majority.

Results
The following table gives the election results:

References

1986 elections in New Zealand
Mayoral elections in Invercargill
October 1986 events in New Zealand